David Chalton Ancrum (born June 9, 1958) is an American retired professional and college basketball player. He played college basketball for Utica College. Subsequently, he had a professional basketball career, and played in several leagues, most notably in the Continental Basketball Association, Greek Basket League and Israeli Basketball Premier League. He was the top scorer in the 1994 Israel Basketball Premier League. He played at the shooting guard position.

College career
Born in New York City, Ancrum grew up in Roosevelt, New York, on Long Island. He played college basketball with Utica College's men's basketball team, from 1978 to 1980. He is the all-time leader in points per game, for his college with an average of 23.1 points per game, in 47 games played. He is also the school's seventh all-time leading scorer, with 1,084 total points scored. He is the only Utica player to reach the 1,000 points scored mark in less than four seasons, and the only Utica player to score more than 600 points in a single season. In 2010 Ancrum was inducted in Utica's hall of fame.

Professional career
Ancrum played professionally for the Albany Patroons, under coach Phil Jackson, from 1984 to 1986. He averaged 14.2 points per game in the 1984–1985 season. He subsequently signed for the Savannah Spirits. He led his team to beat the Patroons 117–110, scoring 23 points. 

After playing basketball in Panama and Ecuador, he signed with Iraklis of the Greek League, in 1987. In his first season, he was only eligible to play in international competitions, since foreign players were not allowed in the Greek League at the time. So in his first season with Iraklis, he only played with the club in the European third tier level FIBA Korać Cup's 1987–88 season competition. He averaged 22.9 points, 3.4 rebounds, 1.9 assists and 1.1 steals per game in that season's Korać Cup.

Starting with the 1988–1989 season, when foreign players were declared eligible in the Greek League, through the 1991–1992 season, he appeared in 104 Greek League games for Iraklis, averaging 33.7 points, 4.5 rebounds, 1.1 assists and 1.1 steals per game. 

He was the top scorer in the 1994 Israel Basketball Premier League.

Coaching career
Ancrum retired from playing professional basketball as the result of a knee injury. He then became a basketball coach at the high school level. He currently lives in Sacramento, California, where he runs the basketball program for Sacramento Country Day School.

References

External links 
FIBA Europe profile
Israeli Super League profile

1958 births
Living people
Albany Patroons players
American expatriate basketball people in Greece
American expatriate basketball people in Israel
American men's basketball players
Basketball players from Sacramento, California
Basketball players from New York City
Hapoel Afula players
High school basketball coaches in California
Iraklis Thessaloniki B.C. players
Israeli Basketball Premier League players
Junior college men's basketball players in the United States
Maccabi Tel Aviv B.C. players
Morrisville State College alumni
Savannah Spirits players
Shooting guards
Utica Pioneers men's basketball players